Simone Alberghini (born 16 April 1973) is an Italian operatic baritone, known especially for his interpretations of belcanto operas of Mozart and Rossini.

Career

Born in Bologna, Italy, Alberghini began singing at a very young age pop music and jazz. He started then studying operatic singing with tenor Oslavio di Credico at first, then with the pianist and conductor Leone Magiera and with the baritone Carlo Meliciani.

In 1993 he made his debut as Lorenzo in Bellini's I Capuleti e i Montecchi at the Teatro Regio of Turin.

In 1994 he won the first prize at the international Operalia competition, organised by Plácido Domingo in Mexico City.

Since then, he has sung in the most important theatres of the world, like La Scala in Milan, the Royal Opera House in London (Dandini in Rossini's La Cenerentola and Athanael in Massenet's Thaïs with Renée Fleming), the Metropolitan Opera House in New York (Dandini),<ref>Review of the 2009 production, The New York Times</ref> Teatro San Carlo in Naples, La Fenice in Venice, Liceu in Barcelona, Los Angeles Opera, Wiener Staatsoper, Bolshoi in Moscow and in festivals like Glyndebourne and Rossini Opera Festival in Pesaro.

Alberghini sang under the baton of such conductors like Riccardo Muti, Zubin Mehta, Seiji Ozawa, Michael Tilson Thomas, Riccardo Chailly, Maurizio Benini, Teodor Currentzis, Michele Mariotti, Alberto Zedda and in productions by directors like Jonathan Miller, Luca Ronconi, Graham Vick, Francesca Zambello, Peter Hall, Pier Luigi Pizzi, Damiano Michieletto.

Repertoire

Personal life
Alberghini is married to the Russian mezzo-soprano Anna Goryachova.

Discography
 Bellini, Adelson e Salvini – Barcellona/Scala/Muraro/Alberghini – conducted by D. Rustioni, Opera Rara
 Bellini, I Capuleti e i Montecchi – Mei/Kasarova/Vargas/Alberghini/Chiummo – conducted by R. Abbado, EMI
 Bellini, Zaira – Hernandez/Alberghini/Malavasi/Scala – conducted by G. Sagripanti, BONGIOVANNI
 Giordano, Andrea Chenier – Bocelli/Urmana/Gallo/Alberghini – conducted by M. Armiliato, DECCA
 Martinu, Mirandolina – Bruera/Tonsini/Marabelli/Alberghini – conducted by R. Frizza, BBC
 Rossini, Trovando e Dorliska – Takova/Pertusi/Meli/Alberghini- conducted by Pablo Perez, DYNAMIC

DVD and Blu-ray
 Daugherty, Jackie O – Mc Andrew/Sorouzian/Alberghini – conducted by Franklin, DYNAMIC
 Donizetti, Il Furioso all’Isola di San Domingo – Alberghini/Forte/Marsiglia- conducted by G. Di Stefano, BONGIOVANNI
 Donizetti, Maria Stuarda – Devia/Antonacci/Meli/Alberghini – conducted by A. Fogliani, RAI TRADE
 Donizetti, Maria Stuarda – Piscitelli/Polverelli/De Biasio/Alberghini – conducted by R. Frizza, NAXOS
 Rossini, Guillaume Tell – Alaimo/Rebeka/Florez/Forsythe/Alberghini – conducted by M. Mariotti, DECCA
 Rossini, La Cenerentola – Garanča/Brownlee/Corbelli/Alberghini – conducted by M. Benini, DEUTSCHE GRAMMOPHON
 Rossini, La Cenerentola – Donose/Mironov/Di Pasquale/Alberghini – conducted by V. Jurowski, OPUS ARTE
 Rossini, Trovando e Dorliska – Takova/Pertusi/Meli/Praticò/Alberghini – conducted by V. Pablo Perez, DYNAMIC

References

External links

schedule, Operabase
Alberghini on iTunes
Discography for Naxos
Discography for Dynamic
Allan Kozinn, "Cenerentola, The Metropolitan Opera House, New York", The New York Times'', 10 October 2005.

1973 births
Living people
Musicians from Bologna
Italian operatic baritones
20th-century Italian male opera singers
21st-century Italian male opera singers
Operalia, The World Opera Competition prize-winners